Jane Dorothy Hartley (born April 18, 1950) is an American diplomat who has served as the United States ambassador to the United Kingdom in the Joe Biden administration since 2022. She served as the United States ambassador to France and Monaco from 2014 until 2017 during the Barack Obama administration. She is also a member of the Council on Foreign Relations.

Education 

Hartley earned a bachelor's degree from Newton College of the Sacred Heart (now part of Boston College) in 1972.

Career 

Hartley began working as the executive director for the Democratic Mayors' Conference for the Democratic National Committee from 1974 until 1977. She then worked as director of congressional relations in the United States Department of Housing and Urban Development from 1977 to 1978. She worked as an associate assistant to the president in the Office of Public Liaison during the administration of President Jimmy Carter, from 1978 until 1981.

From 1981 until 1983, Hartley worked as a vice president for Group W Cable and later as vice president of corporate communications at Westinghouse Broadcasting from 1983 until 1985. She was a vice president of marketing for MCA Broadcasting from 1985 until 1987. From 1987 until 1989, Hartley was station manager of WWOR-TV.

From 1994 until 2007, Hartley worked for the G7 Group, serving as CEO from 1995 until 2007. Beginning in 2007, she became the chief executive officer of the Observatory Group, which is an economic and political consulting advisory firm with offices around the world.

On January 26, 2011, President Obama nominated Hartley to serve on the board of the Corporation for National and Community Service. The U.S. Senate confirmed her by unanimous consent on April 26, 2012.

Ambassador to France 

On June 6, 2014, President Obama announced his intention to nominate Hartley to be United States Ambassador to France and the United States Ambassador to Monaco to replace Charles Rivkin, whom Obama tapped to become an assistant Secretary of State. Obama formally nominated Hartley on June 9, 2014.

Hartley is known for being a campaign bundler who raised more than $500,000 for Obama's re-election bid in 2012.

Hearings on her nomination were held before the Senate Foreign Relations Committee on July 15, 2014. The committee reported her nomination favorably on July 29, 2014. On September 16, 2014, the U.S. Senate confirmed Hartley by voice vote to be the U.S. ambassador to both France and Monaco. She took her oath of office on October 15, 2014, from Vice President Joe Biden.

On January 11, 2015, Hartley represented the United States at a unity march in Paris following the Charlie Hebdo shooting.

In June 2015, following revelations that the U.S. had spied on French political leaders, Élisabeth Guigou, president of the Foreign Affairs Committee in the National Assembly, invited Hartley to appear before members. Hartley declined the invitation.

In late 2015, Hartley proposed that Jeff Koons create an artwork to be offered to the City of Paris in homage to the victims of the 2015 terrorist attacks. The resultant work, Bouquet of Tulips, has raised objections in the French art world that it is inappropriate, as has the singlehanded nature of Koons' selection.

Ambassador to the United Kingdom 
In July 2021, it was reported that Hartley was selected by President Joe Biden as the U.S. Ambassador to the United Kingdom. He officially announced her nomination on January 19, 2022. Hearings on her nomination were held before the Senate Foreign Relations Committee on May 4, 2022. The committee favorably reported her nomination to the Senate floor on May 18, 2022. The Senate confirmed her to the post by voice vote on May 25, 2022. She was sworn in as the ambassador on May 27, 2022. She presented her credentials to Queen Elizabeth II on July 19, 2022.

Hartley accompanied Joe and Jill Biden as they visited Westminster Hall on September 18, 2022 to pay their respects to the late Elizabeth II as her coffin laid in state.

Personal life 

Hartley is married to investment banker and Evercore Partners CEO Ralph Schlosstein. They have two children. She has been a member of the Council on Foreign Relations for more than 10 years.

See also
 Ambassadors of the United States

References

External links 
 
 Jane Dorothy Hartley at the U.S. Department of State Office of the Historian

|-

1947 births
Living people
Ambassadors of the United States to France
Ambassadors of the United States to Monaco
Ambassadors of the United States to the United Kingdom
American women ambassadors
Carnegie Endowment for International Peace
Carter administration personnel
21st-century American diplomats
21st-century American women
Newton College of the Sacred Heart alumni
American women diplomats